Camellia taliensis (also known as Yunnan large leaf varietal tea, wild tea, Dali tea, Yunnan broad tea, and others; 大理茶) is a species of evergreen shrub or small tree whose leaves and leaf buds are used to produce tea.

It is of the genus Camellia of flowering plants in the family Theaceae.

C. taliensis is an important wild relative to the cultivated tea plant Camellia sinensis. It also belongs to the same section Thea as C. sinensis.

The species is cultivated on many farms in Yunnan province in China and not considered endangered. However, its wild populations are shrinking due to human caused fragmentation of the plant's natural habitat and from overpicking of the leaves for the tea market.

Nomenclature and taxonomy

Description 

Camellia talensis has five locules per ovary while in comparison C. sinensis has three locules per ovary.

It grows primarily in the southwestern portion of Yunnan and in neighboring areas in Thailand and northern Myanmar.

C. taliensis has larger leaves than C. sinensis var. sinensis closer to the size of C. sinensis var. assamica. And, in several chemical composition and morphological comparisons, C. taliensis is also closer to C. sinensis var. assamica than to C. sinensis var. sinensis. However, the closer similarity may also be due to human selection (which causes reduction in genetic diversity) as C. sinensis var. assamica is the tea variety traditionally cultivated in Yunnan.

Like C. sinensis, C. taliensis contains both theanine and caffeine.

C. talensis can be easily crossed with C. sinensis, and the resulting crossbred plants are intermediate between species both morphologically and chemically indicating true hybrids.

Cultivation 

Camellia taliensis is locally used to make white tea, black tea, and pu'er tea.

Yue Guang Bai (月光白 "Moonlight White") is a white tea made from the plant.

Yunnan pu-erh tea made from C. taliensis can command a much higher price than pu'er made from the more common C. sinensis.

References 

 Chen, Jin, Pingsheng Wang, Yongmei Xia, Mei Xu & Shengji Pei. 2005. Genetic diversity and differentiation of Camellia sinensis L. (cultivated tea) and its wild relatives in Yunnan province of China, revealed by morphology, biochemistry and allozyme studies. Genetic Resources and Crop Evolution, 52 (1), 41–52.
 Liu, Yang, Shi-xiong Yang, Peng-zhang Ji & Li-zhi. 2012. Phylogeography of Camellia taliensis (Theaceae) inferred from chloroplast and nuclear DNA: Insights into evolutionary history and conservation. BMC Evolutionary Biology, 12.
 Takeda, Yoshiyuki. 1990. Cross compatibility of tea (Camellia sinensis) and its allied species in the genus Camellia. Japan Agricultural Research Quarterly, 24, 111–116.

Notes

External links
 US National Plant Germplasm System: Camellia taliensis (W. W. Sm.) Melch.

Tea
taliensis